Bird Summons is a 2019 novel by British-Sudanese author Leila Aboulela. It was published by Weidenfeld & Nicolson Ltd an imprint of Orion Publishing Group.

References

2019 British novels
Weidenfeld & Nicolson books
Novels set in Scotland